Goeppertia veitchiana (syn. Calathea veitchiana) is a species of flowering plant in the Marantaceae family. It is endemic to Ecuador. Its natural habitats are subtropical or tropical moist lowland forests and subtropical or tropical moist montane forests.

The plant was discovered near Cuenca by the Victorian plant collector Richard Pearce in 1862, and named in honour of his employers, James Veitch & Sons.

Similar species

In 1983 a new species of Calathea was described from Peru, that, although not closely related to C.veitchiana, shows the same leaf pattern and had been previously misidentified in collections as C.veitchiana. This new species was named Calathea pseudoveitchiana, and is now Goeppertia pseudoveitchiana.

References

veitchiana
Endemic flora of Ecuador
Veitch Nurseries
Near threatened plants
Taxonomy articles created by Polbot
Taxobox binomials not recognized by IUCN